Berowra may refer to :
Berowra, New South Wales, a suburb of Sydney, Australia
Berowra Heights, New South Wales, a neighbouring suburb
Berowra Waters, New South Wales, a neighbouring suburb
Berowra railway station, in the suburb 
the Division of Berowra an Australian Electoral Division that includes that suburb and others